Brussels-West Station is a multimodal transport hub located in the municipality of Molenbeek-Saint-Jean, in the western part of Brussels, Belgium. The metro station opened on 6 October 1982 as part of the Beekkant–Saint Guidon/Sint-Guido extension of former line 1B. Following the reorganisation of the Brussels Metro on 4 April 2009, it is served by lines 1, 2, 5 and 6.

History
The train station was initially opened in 1872 on the western orbital railroad of Brussels, line 28. It used to be an extensive goods yard, with the station building located close to the current location of Beekkant metro station. After the closure of the goods yard, the platforms were moved south. The train station was closed for passengers in 1984, but reopened in December 2009 in the framework of the Brussels Regional Express Network (RER/GEN) project.

From 6 October 1982, the station was also served by the former line 1B of the Brussels Metro. With the completion of the loop of the line 2 and the reorganisation of the Brussels metro network in April 2009, all Brussels metro lines (1, 2, 5 and 6) now serve the station. The station also connects with tram and bus lines, and the new Jacques Brel bus and metro depot has been built nearby.

Current services
Since its rebuilding in 2009, the West Station is becoming a major multimodal transport hub in western Brussels which will gain importance in the framework of the Brussels RER/GEN development.

National Rail (SNCB/NMBS)
The station is served by the following service(s):

 Brussels RER/GEN services (S10) Dendermonde - Brussels - Denderleeuw - Aalst

Brussels metro (STIB/MIVB)
On the metro network, the station is called Gare de l'Ouest in French and Weststation in Dutch. It is served by all metro lines (1-5 and 2-6). Changing between the two metro lines (1/5 and 2/6), is however, very cumbersome, requiring passengers to go up the escalator, leave the fare controlled area and cross the main railway line and down through a fare gate again. That change is better done at the next station, Beekkant.

Brussels tram lines (STIB/MIVB)
 Line 82 Berchem Station - Drogenbos Castle
 Line 83 Berchem Station - Montgomery

Brussels bus lines (STIB/MIVB)
 Line 86 Machtens - Central Station

Flemish bus lines (De Lijn)
 126 North Station - Ninove (Express)
 127 North Station - Ninove
 128 North station - Ninove
 129 North Station - Dilbeek Zuurweide
 620 Brussels Airport - Erasme Hospital

External links

Railway stations in Brussels
Brussels metro stations
Molenbeek-Saint-Jean
Railway stations opened in 1872
Railway stations opened in 1982
Railway stations opened in 2009